An election to the County Council of London took place on 5 March 1913. It was the ninth triennial election of the whole Council.
The size of the council was 118 councillors and 19 aldermen. The councillors were elected for electoral divisions corresponding to the parliamentary constituencies that had been created by the Representation of the People Act 1884. There were 57 dual member constituencies and one four member constituency. The council was elected by First Past the Post with each elector having two votes in the dual member seats. Unlike for parliamentary elections, women qualified as electors for these elections on exactly the same basis as men. Women were also permitted to stand as candidates for election.

The election was to be the last held before the outbreak of the First World War: in 1915 legislation was enacted to postpone all local elections until the end of the conflict (see below). The term of office of the councillors was extended to 1919 when triennial elections resumed.

National government background
The Prime Minister of the day was the Liberal H. H. Asquith who led a minority Liberal Government that relied upon the Irish Parliamentary Party for a majority. The recently merged Unionist Party was the official opposition. The Labour Party was the fourth party and generally voted with the Liberals in parliament.

London Council background
The Municipal Reform party had been in power since winning a majority back in 1907. It was now seeking its third consecutive mandate.

Candidates
All constituencies were contested. The governing Municipal Reform Party ran a full slate of 118 candidates. The opposition Progressive Party ran 110 candidates. They ran candidates everywhere except the City of London where they ran three candidates, Hampstead, St George's Hanover Square and Strand where only one candidate stood, three constituencies where one candidate ran in tandem with Labour and Woolwich where they did not oppose a Labour pair. Four Independents also ran.

Labour Party
By 1913, all Labour Party members had withdrawn from the Progressive Party and at these elections stood under their own party label. The party fielded ten candidates, three of these candidates ran in tandem with Progressive candidates, a further two candidates were not opposed by Progressives. The other five all stood in opposition to Progressive candidates. The Labour Party in London had no elected or otherwise recognised Leader.

British Socialist Party
The British Socialist Party had been formed in 1911 from the merger of a few socialist groups with the Social Democratic Federation. As with the SDF, the BSP was opposed to socialists having electoral pacts with Liberals and they were critical of Labour Party branches for working with the Progressives in London. The BSP put forward dual candidates in three constituencies, all constituencies where both the Progressives and Municipal Reform parties were running dual candidates. Nowhere did they run against a Labour candidate.

Outcome
The Municipal Reform Party was returned with its third successive majority, slightly larger than the old one. However, its leader, Cyril Jackson was unseated by the Progressives at Limehouse. When the new council met, the ruling Municipal Reform majority was forced to use one of their Aldermanic nominations to put Jackson back on the council. Although the Progressives lost ground, they comfortably retained their position as main challengers to the Municipal Reformers in those seats where socialists stood.
All socialist candidates (BSP and Labour) who stood against Progressive candidates finished bottom of the poll. Of the three Labour candidates running in tandem with a Progressive, all polled less than the Progressive and two of the three failed to join their Progressive running mate in victory. In Woolwich, where the Labour candidates were given a free run against the Municipal Reform pair, they also lost.

Constituency results
Incumbent Councillors shown in bold.

Battersea and Clapham

Bethnal Green

Camberwell

Chelsea

City of London

Deptford

Finsbury

Fulham

Greenwich

One Labour Party candidate withdrew

Hackney

Hammersmith

Hampstead

Islington

Kensington

One Progressive and one Labour candidate intervene

Lambeth

Lewisham

Marylebone

Newington

Paddington

St George's Hanover Square

St Pancras

Shoreditch

Southwark

Strand

Tower Hamlets

Wandsworth

Westminster

Woolwich

Aldermen
In addition to the 124 councillors the council consisted of 20 county aldermen. Aldermen were elected by the council, and served a six-year term. Half of the aldermanic bench were elected every three years following the triennial council election. After the elections, there were ten aldermanic vacancies and the following alderman were appointed by the newly elected council on 13 March 1913;

To serve until 1919:
Viscount Chelmsford, Municipal Reform. Had previously sat as a councillor in 1904–1905.
Rt. Hon. Sir George Dashwood Taubman Goldie, Municipal Reform. Had previously sat as a councillor in 1907–1912.
George Alexander Hardy, Progressive. Had previously sat as a councillor in 1901–1907.
William Hunt, Municipal Reform, outgoing councillor for Wandsworth, had unsuccessfully contested Islington South.
Cyril Jackson, Municipal Reform, outgoing councillor for Limehouse.
Oswald Partington, Progressive
Sir Herbert James Francis Parsons, Municipal Reform, reappointed.
Mrs. Jessie Wilton Phipps, Municipal Reform
Alfred Henry Scott, Progressive

To serve until 1916:
Katherine Talbot Wallas, Progressive, in place of Henry Lawrence Cripps, resigned 4 February 1913

By-elections 1913–1915
There were eight by-elections to fill casual vacancies during the term of the ninth London County Council.

City of London, 9 May 1913
Cause: resignation of Colonel Sir Stuart Sankey 29 April 1919

Tower Hamlets, Mile End, 13 August 1913
 Cause: death of Carl Stettauer, 24 July 1913

Islington West, 21 February 1914
Cause: death of Henry Lorenzo Jephson 31 January 1914

Marylebone West, 6 July 1914
Cause: death of Sir Edward White 14 June 1914

Finsbury, Holborn, 9 November 1914
 Cause: resignation of Robert Inigo Tasker 27 October 1914 on mobilisation of the 11th Battalion, London Regiment

Tower Hamlets, Limehouse, 14 January 1915
 Cause: resignation of Benjamin B Evans due to ill health 15 December 1914

City of London, 1 March 1915
 Cause: resignation of William Henry Pannell due to ill health 9 February 1915

Lewisham, 8 May 1915
 Cause: resignation of Carlyon Wilfroy Bellairs 27 April 1915

Appointments to vacant seats 1915–1919
Under the Elections and Registration Act 1915, a wartime piece of legislation that cancelled local elections until the end of the conflict (and thus the county council election due to be held in March 1916), the members of the county council were given the power to appoint or co-opt councillors to fill vacant seats. The legislation remained in force for the rest of the eleventh county council's existence.

Aldermanic vacancies filled 1913–1919
There were four casual vacancies among the aldermen in the term of the eleventh London County Council, which were filled as follows:
27 January 1914: Henry Cubitt Gooch (Municipal Reform) to serve until 1916 (extended to 1919) in place of Maurice C Carr Glyn, resigned 20 January 1914. Gooch had previously sat as a councillor from 1907 to 1910.
9 November 1915: Howard Willmott Liversidge (Municipal Reform) to serve until 1916 (extended to 1919) in place of Lord Monk Bretton, resigned 26 October 1915.
7 March 1916: Sir Harry Lushington Stephen (Municipal Reform) to serve until 1919 (extended to 1922) in place of Lord Chelmsford, resigned 22 February 1916.
4 April 1916: Francis Capel Harrison (Municipal Reform) to serve until 1919 (extended to 1922) in place of Cyril Jackson, resigned 21 March 1916.

References

1913 English local elections
County Council election
1913
March 1913 events